Linda Freeman may refer to:
Linda Freeman (Snow Cake), a fictional autistic character, played by Sigourney Weaver, in the 2006 film Snow Cake
Linda Freeman (TV host), host of Good Morning Toronto, see The Weather Network
 Dr. Linda Freeman, the fictional psychiatrist in Two and a Half Men, played by Jane Lynch